Thomas Claiborne (February 1, 17491812) was a planter and politician from Brunswick County, Virginia, who represented Virginia in the United States House of Representatives from 1793 to 1799 and from 1801 to 1805.

Biography
Claiborne was born in 1749 in Brunswick County in the Colony of Virginia, the son of Colonel Augustine and Mary (Herbert) Claiborne. He was the fifth generation of his family in America, descended from William Claiborne who had settled in Virginia in 1621. He is the father of John Claiborne and Thomas Claiborne (1780–1856), uncle of Nathaniel Herbert Claiborne and William Charles Cole Claiborne, granduncle of John Francis Hamtramck Claiborne, and great-great-great-great-granduncle of Corinne Claiborne Boggs. He owned slaves.

Claiborne was a member of the State house of delegates (1783–1788), served as colonel in command of the Brunswick County Militia in 1789, sheriff of Brunswick County (1789–1792), and a member of the state senate (1790–1792). He was elected to the Third Congress and reelected as a Republican to the Fourth and Fifth Congresses. His bid for  reelection in 1798 was unsuccessful, but he was again elected as a Republican to the Seventh and Eighth Congresses. He died on his estate in Brunswick County in 1812.

He was the father of United States Congressman Thomas Claiborne (1780–1856).

References

External links

1749 births
1812 deaths
People from Brunswick County, Virginia
Virginia colonial people
Claiborne family
American people of English descent
Anti-Administration Party members of the United States House of Representatives from Virginia
Democratic-Republican Party members of the United States House of Representatives from Virginia
Virginia state senators
American planters
American slave owners